Olha Volodymyrivna Volkova (born 5 July 1986 in Mykolaiv) is a freestyle skier from Ukraine  who specializes in aerials. She won a bronze medal at the 2011 FIS Freestyle World Ski Championships.

References

External links
 FIS-Ski.com Profile
 

1986 births
Living people
Ukrainian female freestyle skiers
Olympic freestyle skiers of Ukraine
Sportspeople from Mykolaiv
Freestyle skiers at the 2006 Winter Olympics
Freestyle skiers at the 2010 Winter Olympics